This is a listing of the ministers who served in the National Democratic Congress government of John Atta Mills in Ghana following its inauguration on 7 January 2009 after his victory in the 2008 Ghanaian general election held in December 2008. The government was in power for less than the four years stipulated. 

The Mills presidency ended on 24 July 2012 when President John Atta Mills died following illness. Mills was succeeded by his vice president, John Dramani Mahama as specified by the Ghana constitution.

John Mahama was sworn in on the same day by the Chief Justice of Ghana and he continued with most of the ministers from this government. The change happened just months before the 2012 Ghanaian general election scheduled for December 2012.

List of ministers

Mills' government changes

2009
The first batch of ministers in the NDC government were sworn in on 13 January 2009. Betty Mould-Iddrisu who was initially out of the country was later sworn in as Ghana's first female Attorney General and Minister for Justice.

Muntaka Mohammed Mubarak, the Minister for Sports, resigned on 25 June 2009 following findings of financial impropriety against him by a committee set up by government. Two additional ministers, Dr. George Yankey, Minister for Health and Ahmed Seidu, Minister at the Presidency tended their resignations on 10 October 2009, following allegations of having accepted bribes from a United Kingdom company many years prior to the formation of this government. Both ministers claim to be innocent of the allegations and are to be investigated by the Commission on Human Rights and Administrative Justice at the request of President Mills.

2010
On 25 January 2010, President Mills conducted his first cabinet reshuffle. There were changes of ministers in 7 ministries and one change of regional minister. In all, four new ministers came into government including Alban Bagbin, the Majority Leader in parliament and his deputy, John Tia. Also in were Enoch T. Mensah, a former minister in the Rawlings NDC government and Martin Amidu, the new Interior minister.

On 11 May 2010, Mahmud Khalid, the Upper West Regional Minister was dismissed by President Mills. Khalid suggested members of his party lobbied for his dismissal. Alhaji Issaku Saliah, a former MP for Wa West was nominated as his replacement and approved by parliament on 23 July 2010.

2011
The second cabinet reshuffle by President Mills was in January 2011. 9 ministries were affected in all. One Regional minister was also changed. Notable changes including replacing Betty Mould-Iddrisu with Martin Amidu as Attorney-General. Zita Okaikoi and Alex Tettey-Enyo were dropped from government.

2012
In January 2012, Martin Amidu was sacked by President Mills. This followed allegations he made suggesting some members of the ruling party may be corrupt. He was asked to substantiate his allegations by Mills and subsequently sacked ostensibly because he was unable to do so. A few days later, Betty Mould-Iddrissu, Minister for Education who was the Attorney-General before Amidu tended her resignation as Minister for Education. This was accepted by President Mills who appointed Enoch Mensah to replace her as Minister for Education temporarily. A cabinet reshuffle was announced a few days later via a press release from the Office of the President. There were new ministers nominated for approval by parliament. These include William Kwasi Aboah for Interior, Lee Ocran for Education, Fritz Baffour MP for Ablekuma South for Information, Moses Asaga for Employment and Social Welfare, Dominic Azimbe Azumah, MP for Garu - Timpane – Minister of State and Amin Amidu Sulemani, Upper West Regional Minister designate. They were all sworn in on 24 February 2012 by President Mills after having been approved by the Parliament of Ghana. On 26 March 2012, President Mills appointed two new regional ministers. The former ambassador to the Czech Republic, Victor Emmanuel Smith became the new Eastern Region Minister and the MP for Buem, Henry Kamel Ford became the new Volta Region Minister.

Death of President Mills
On 25 July 25 2012, President Mills was taken ill and died a few hours afterwards at the 37 Military Hospital in Accra.

See also
National Democratic Congress
Rawlings government
Presidency of John Atta Mills

References

External links and sources
Ghana government official website: List of Ministers

Mills
Mills
2009 establishments in Ghana
Lists of government ministers of Ghana
Mills